Highway 160 (AR 160, Ark. 160, and Hwy. 160) is a designation for four state highways in South Arkansas. The northernmost segment of  runs from Farm to Market Road 249 at the Texas state line near Bloomburg, Texas east to Highway 19 at Macedonia. A second segment of  runs east from Highway 57 east to Highway 7 Business in Smackover. In southern Calhoun County, Highway 160 begins at US Route 278 (US 278) and runs east to US 425 in Fountain Hill.

Route description

Texas to Macedonia

Highway 160 begins at State Line Avenue as Farm to Market Road 249 near Bloomburg, Texas and heads east to a junction with Highway 237 before a junction with US 71 near Doddridge. The route runs underneath Interstate 49 before it crosses the Red River to enter Lafayette County. The route continues east, passing Gin City where it meets Highway 360, Conway Cemetery on the National Register of Historic Places, and Highway 29 in Bradley. Highway 160 heads southeast around Lake Erling before forming a concurrency north with Highway 53 to Walker Creek.

The route enters Columbia County near Taylor where it forms a  officially designated exception over US 371 before continuing northeast to Macedonia where it terminates at Highway 19.

Mount Holly to Smackover
Highway 160 begins at Highway 57 in Mount Holly in the northwest corner of Union County. The route runs northeast to a junction with Highway 7 outside Smackover before entering the city limits. Highway 160 terminates at Highway 7 Business (7th Street) near Smackover High School.

Harrell to Fountain Hill route
Arkansas Highway 160 travels south until meeting AR 172, after which it begins to arrow east to join with US 63/AR 15. The merge continues until Hermitage, when AR 160 continues south past Ingalls and Vick (crossing the Fordyce & Princeton Railroad). The route then angles north towards Highway 8 in Johnsville. Beyond Johnsville, AR 160 becomes concurrent with AR 133 until Fountain Hill, where it terminates.

Major intersections
Mile markers reset at some concurrencies.

See also

 List of state highways in Arkansas

References

External links

160
Transportation in Ashley County, Arkansas
Transportation in Bradley County, Arkansas
Transportation in Calhoun County, Arkansas
Transportation in Chicot County, Arkansas
Transportation in Columbia County, Arkansas
Transportation in Lafayette County, Arkansas
Transportation in Miller County, Arkansas
Transportation in Union County, Arkansas